The rufous-capped antshrike (Thamnophilus ruficapillus) is a species of bird in the family Thamnophilidae.
It is found in Argentina, Bolivia, Brazil, Paraguay, Peru, and Uruguay.
Its natural habitats are subtropical or tropical moist montane forests, subtropical or tropical moist shrubland, and subtropical or tropical high-altitude shrubland.

The rufous-capped antshrike was described by the French ornithologist Louis Vieillot in 1816 and given its current binomial name Thamnophilus ruficapillus.

References

rufous-capped antshrike
Birds of Argentina
Birds of the Atlantic Forest
Birds of the Selva Misionera
Birds of the South Region
Birds of Uruguay
Birds of the Yungas
rufous-capped antshrike
Taxa named by Louis Jean Pierre Vieillot
Taxonomy articles created by Polbot